Arthur John Fielding (17 March 1888 – before 1960) was an English footballer who played as a forward for Bolton Wanderers, Stoke, and Port Vale.

Career
Fielding was born in Stoke-upon-Trent, and started his career with local clubs Dresden Athletic and Dresden Victoria, before moving on to Florence Colliery. He signed with Bolton Wanderers before returning to Florence Colliery. In 1908 he joined Birmingham & District League side Stoke, and made three appearances in 1908–09, before returning to amateur football with Florence Colliery. In September 1910 he joined North Staffordshire & District League side Port Vale, scoring five goals in six overall appearances; however after suffering an injury in October of that year he dropped out of the team and was released at the end of the campaign.

Career statistics
Source:

References

Footballers from Stoke-on-Trent
English footballers
Association football forwards
Bolton Wanderers F.C. players
Stoke City F.C. players
Port Vale F.C. players
1888 births
Year of death missing